Nathan W. Collier (1872–1941) was an American academic administrator who served as president of Florida Baptist Institute and then Florida Normal and Technical Institute from 1896 onward. Florida Baptist Institute was established by Collier and Sarah Ann Blocker who combined Florida Baptist Institute and Florida Baptist Academy to form it. Collier was president of the school from 1896-1941. The institution later became Florida Memorial University.

Collier was from Augusta, Georgia. He graduated from Ware High School and Atlanta University. Collier was involved in the latter school's move from Jacksonville.

Collier-Blocker Junior College was named for him and Blocker. The Nathan W. Collier Library at Florida Memorial University is also named for him. The university also gives an award for service to it in his name. There is also a Collier Blocker Puryear Park, named for the university's founders.

References

1872 births
1941 deaths
People from Augusta, Georgia
Clark Atlanta University alumni
African-American academics
Florida Memorial University
20th-century African-American people